Four from Toyah is the second EP by the English new wave band Toyah, fronted by Toyah Willcox, released in 1981 by Safari Records. It reached the Top 5 in the UK Singles Chart on the back of its lead track, "It's a Mystery".

Background
It was the band's first release to feature the new lineup of Willcox, Joel Bogen, Phil Spalding, Nigel Glockler and Adrian Lee. Although it was released in the 7" vinyl single format, it was essentially and EP with four songs. Toyah clarified that the band didn't feel under pressure to write and include those extra songs on Four from Toyah nor its follow-up Four More from Toyah: "We did produce extra songs for quality of money. I never felt under pressure. (...) It was a joy to write these extra songs and also, because these EPs were standalone, it meant that I could explore lyrical avenues that perhaps I wouldn't be able to put onto an album".

Apart from "It's a Mystery", the EP featured "War Boys" which Toyah wanted to be the lead track instead, "Revelations" with lyrics telling about predictions, and "Angels & Demons" which Toyah said is about "growing up and everything you're told not to believe in". "It's a Mystery" would later appear on the album Anthem, although the other three tracks would not appear on an album until the original CD release of Anthem in 1985. They were also included in the album's 1999 CD re-issue as well as the 2005 compilation The Safari Singles Collection Part 2: 1981–1983.

The EP was the breakthrough for the band, reaching number 4 in the UK Singles Charts on the back of its lead track, "It's a Mystery", and becoming Toyah's first number 1 in the UK Independent Singles Chart. It is listed at number 49 on the official top 50 best-selling singles of 1981 and was eventually certified silver in the UK. In June 2021, Four from Toyah was re-released by Cherry Red Records in 12" vinyl format for Record Store Day, with additional tracks and new artwork.

Track listing

Original 7" release
Side A
"It's a Mystery" (Keith Hale) – 4:13
"Revelations" (Joel Bogen, Toyah Willcox) – 3:34

Side B
"War Boys" (Willcox) – 3:38
"Angels & Demons" (Willcox, Hale) – 6:50

2021 12" re-release
Side A
"It's a Mystery"
"Revelations"
"War Boys"
"Angels & Demons"

Side B
"It's a Mystery" (Original Version; Blood Donor feat. Toyah Willcox)
"Jack & Jill"
"The Merchant & the Nubile"
"Angels & Demons" (Demo)

Personnel
 Toyah Willcox – vocals
 Joel Bogen – guitar
 Phil Spalding – bass
 Nigel Glockler – drums
 Adrian Lee – keyboards

Charts

Certifications

References

1981 EPs
Toyah (band) albums
UK Independent Singles Chart number-one singles